The Ambassador of Sweden to Germany is in charge of the Sweden's diplomatic mission to Germany.

Braunschweig-Lüneburg
1705 Carl Gustaf Friesendorff

Hannover 
1699 Henning von Strahlenheim 
1699–1711 Carl Gustaf Friesendorff

Kingdom of Prussia
1698–1700 Anders Leijonstedt 
1703–1710 Anders Leijonstedt (and Herman Cedercreutz)
1705–1707 Johannes Rosenhane
1712–1715 Carl Gustaf Friesendorff
1719 Herr Kirbach 
1740–1743 Gustaf Zülich
1743 Henning Gyllenborg
1744–1746 Carl Gustaf Tessin
1787–1794 Carl Eherenfried von Carisien
1798–1803 Lars von Engeström

Saxony
1706 Josias Cederhielm
1729–1732 Gustaf Zülich

German Reich 
Frederik Due, 1871–1873
Gillis Bildt, 1874–1886
Alfred Lagerheim, 1886–1899
Arvid Taube, 1900–1909
Eric Trolle, 1909–1912
Arvid Taube, 1912–1916
Hans-Henrik von Essen, 1917–1923
Fredrik Ramel, 1923–1925
Einar af Wirsén, 1925–1937
Arvid Richert, 1937–1945

German Democratic Republic (East Germany) 
Carl Johan Rappe, 1973 - 1976
Erik Virgin, 1976−1982
Rune Nyström, 1982–1985
Henrik Liljegren, 1985–1989
Vidar Hellners, 1989–1990

Federal Republic of Germany (West Germany) 
Ragnar Kumlin 1950-1956
Ole Jödahl, 1956–67
Nils Montan, 1967–1972
Sven Backlund, 1972–1983
Lennart Eckerberg, 1983–1990

Federal Republic of Germany 
Torsten Örn, 1990–1994
Örjan Berner, 1994–1996
Mats Hellström, 1996–2001
Carl Tham, 2002–2006
Ruth Jacoby, 2006–2010
Staffan Carlsson 2010–2015
Lars Danielsson 2015–2017
Per Thöresson 2017–present

See also 
Diplomatic missions of Sweden

External links 
Embassy of Sweden in Berlin, official website

 
Germany
Sweden